The 2023 East–West Shrine Bowl was the 98th edition of the all–star college football exhibition to benefit Shriners Hospital for Children. The game was played at Allegiant Stadium in Paradise, Nevada, on February 2, 2023, starting at 5:30 p.m. PST and televised on the NFL Network. It was one of the final 2022–23 bowl games concluding the 2022 FBS football season. The game featured NCAA players (predominantly from the Football Bowl Subdivision) and one invitee from Canadian university football—Theo Benedet, an offensive lineman from the UBC Thunderbirds.

Coaches
Organizers, in cooperation with the National Football League (NFL), announced that coaching staffs for the game would be provided by the Atlanta Falcons and New England Patriots.

Note: additional members of the coaching staffs are not listed here

Game summary

References

External links

East West Shrine Bowl
East–West Shrine Bowl
Events in Paradise, Nevada
American football in Nevada
Sports competitions in Las Vegas
East West Shrine Bowl
East West Shrine Bowl